The 2019 season was the 12th season for the IPL cricket franchise Royal Challengers Bangalore. They were one of the eight teams that competed in the tournament. RCB continued under Kohli's captaincy and finished the season with five wins from 14 matches and 11 points.

Background

Player retention, transfers and auction

In November 2018, the Royal Challengers announced their list of retained players for the 2019 season. The list included Virat Kohli, AB de Villiers, Parthiv Patel, Yuzvendra Chahal, Washington Sundar, Pawan Negi, Nathan Coulter-Nile, Moeen Ali, Mohammed Siraj, Colin de Grandhomme, Tim Southee, Umesh Yadav, Navdeep Saini, Kulwant Khejroliya and Marcus Stoinis.

On 18 December 2018, the IPL player auction was held in which the Royal Challengers signed up nine more players viz., Shivam Dube, Shimron Hetmyer, Akshdeep Nath, Prayas Barman, Himmat Singh, Gurkeerat Singh Mann, Heinrich Klaasen, Devdutt Padikkal and Milind Kumar. Their squad strength was 24 with 16 Indian and 8 overseas players.

Transfers Quinton de Kock to Mumbai Indians; Mandeep Singh to Kings XI Punjab in return for Marcus Stoinis.

Team analysis
ESPNcricinfo editor Varun Shetty wrote in his team preview that the Royal Challengers "might struggle once more with their balance" despite the presence of several all-rounders in the squad and predicted that the team would make it to the playoffs if Kohli has "another season of big runs". According to the Indian Express, the team's strength is its batting lineup while the unavailability of overseas all-rounders for the entire season could be the weakness. The preview also stated that Kohli, whose captaincy was recently criticized by former cricketers, "will be eager to prove them wrong". The Times of India remarked that "Bowling, especially in the death overs, continues to be a cause for worry for RCB." News18 tipped Shimron Hetmyer as one of the five first-time overseas players to watch out for in the season, while the Hindu named Shivam Dube among the uncapped Indian players "who could create ripples" at the tournament.

Squad

 Players with international caps are listed in bold.

Coaching and support staff
 Team and cricket operations manager -  Avinash Vaidya
 Head coach -  Gary Kirsten
 Assistant coaches -  Mithun Manhas,  NS Negi,  Vikram Solanki,  Kabir Ali
 Bowling coach -  Ashish Nehra
 Physiotherapist -  Evan Speechly

Ref

Season

League table

Results by match

Results 

The Royal Challengers made 143 runs in the last 10 overs while batting, the most by any team in an IPL match.

Statistics

Most runs

 Source:Cricinfo

Most wickets

 Source:Cricinfo

References

2019 Indian Premier League
Royal Challengers Bangalore seasons
2010s in Bangalore